Presidentti (Finnish: “The President”) is a Finnish political drama series that was broadcast on Yle TV1 from 5 February to 23 April 2017. The series was directed by Lauri Nurkse, written by Kirsti Manninen and Antti Pesonen, and produced by Zodiak Finland.

Plot 
In 2018, successful businessman Henri Talvio, nominee of a party called Liike (“Movement”), is elected President of Finland. While in office, he faces severe crises both in politics and in his private life.

Cast 
 Samuli Edelmann as Henri Talvio, President of the Republic
 Laura Malmivaara as Anna Talvio, spouse of the President
 Inka Kallén as Petra Pennanen, Prime Minister
 Tommi Eronen as Arto Rahikainen, communications manager of the President
 Antti Virmavirta as Pentti Sirelius, state secretary of the Prime Minister
 Rea Mauranen as Marjatta Kuusisto, chief of staff of the President
 Mikko Leppilampi as Jani Eronen, consultant of energy industry and lover of the Prime Minister
 Joel Mäkinen as Elias Talvio, chair of the Liike and son of the President
 Mats Långbacka as Erik Bergholm, Minister for Foreign Affairs
 Kristiina Halttu as Camilla Bergholm, spouse of the Minister of Foreign Affairs
 Esko Salminen as Väinö Vallgren, media proprietor and owner of the Saldo magazine
 Samuli Niittymäki as Riku Lehtinen, editor-in-chief of the Saldo magazine
 Iida-Maria Heinonen as Iines, assistant of the President
 Iida Lampela as Mai, assistant of the President
 Olavi Uusivirta as Kalle Kivijärvi, Minister of Finance and chair of the Environment Party
 Marjaana Maijala as Sari Puhakka, editor-in-chief of Yle Uutiset
 Lotta Lindroos as Annika Pitkänen, vice chair of the Liike

Episodes

References 

2017 in Finnish television
Political drama television series
Finnish drama television series